Starbug may refer to:

 Jan Krissler or Starbug ( 2002–2018), a German hacker and researcher
 Starbug, a fictional spacecraft in Red Dwarf